Mr. Freeze is a supervillain appearing in DC Comics.

Mr. Freeze may also refer to:
 Mr. Freeze (Batman), the version of the character appearing in TV series Batman
 Victor Fries (Batman & Robin), commonly known as Mr. Freeze, the version of the character appearing in the film Batman & Robin
 Mr. Freeze (The Batman), the version of the character appearing in TV series The Batman
 Mr. Freeze (Gotham character), the version of the character appearing in TV series Gotham
 Mr. Freeze (Gotham episode), an episode of Gotham
 Mr. Freeze (roller coaster), also known as Mr. Freeze: Reverse Blast 
 Mr. Freeze, a brand of freezie